Operation Adolphe (also referred to as Adolph) a military operation by the French Army that took place during the First Indochina War, commencing in April 1953. It was the last of several operations that spring, concluding before the monsoon season made campaigning difficult until the commencement of Operation Camargue in July.

Notes

References
Printed
 
 
 
 
 
 
 
 
 
Singer, B. (2004). Cultured force: Makers and defenders of the french colonial empire. Madison, WI: University of Wisconsin Press.

1953 in French Indochina
1953 in Vietnam
Battles and operations of the First Indochina War
Military operations involving France
Battles involving Vietnam
Conflicts in 1953
Vietnamese independence movement
April 1953 events in Asia